Scott Brennan may refer to:
Scott Brennan (comedian), Australian actor and comedian
Scott Brennan (rower) (born 1983), Australian Olympic rower